Museo d'Arte Moderna Vittoria Colonna (Italian for Museum of modern art Vittoria Colonna)  is a modern art museum in Pescara, Abruzzo.

History

Collection

Notes

External links

Pescara
Art museums and galleries in Abruzzo
Contemporary art galleries in Italy